"The Best Bits of Mr. Bean" is the fifteenth episode, compilation and series finale of the British television series Mr. Bean, produced by Tiger Aspect Productions and Thames Television for Central Independent Television. It was first broadcast on ITV on Friday, 15 December 1995.

Plot 
During a rainy day, Mr. Bean and Teddy venture into the attic to look for an umbrella so they can go to the park and feed the ducks. He sticks a tiny drink umbrella into Teddy's head, but finds that his own umbrella is broken. While looking for another one, Bean uncovers various items from his past adventures, like the time Bean had to dress himself on the way to the dentist, the time he fell asleep in church, when he had a Christmas turkey stuck on his head and even the time a tank crushed his Mini. When he finally finds an umbrella, he looks out the window to find that the rain has stopped. Bean angrily leaves the attic as a boomerang he threw out the window earlier finally lands on the roof.

Alternative version 
The original transmission of this episode ran for 72 minutes, but later releases and TV broadcasts starting from 2010 were cut to 52 minutes under the heading The Best of Mr. Bean. Clips deleted from the later edits included Bean helping a busker in The Return of Mr. Bean, Bean trying to stay awake in church and sitting in an exam from the pilot episode, as well as newly released footage of Bean accidentally pulling his television aerial cable and lifting the television up from the floor below (before letting go and smashing it). However, the original uncut version can be found on most pre-2010 video releases of the series.

Production 
John Howard Davies, producer and director of the first three episodes, returned to direct this final episode. Davies was also head of light entertainment at Thames Television when the pilot episode was commissioned in 1989.

Both versions of the choral theme tune are heard - the version by the choir of Southwark Cathedral for the opening titles and the version by the Choir of Christ Church Cathedral, Oxford for the closing credits.

References

External links 

Mr. Bean episodes
1995 British television episodes
Clip shows
Television shows written by Rowan Atkinson
Television shows written by Richard Curtis
Television shows written by Robin Driscoll
Television shows written by Ben Elton
British television series finales